Tongji University, is a station on Line 10 of the Shanghai Metro. It began operation on April 10, 2010. It is named after the nearby Tongji University.

References 
 

Railway stations in Shanghai
Shanghai Metro stations in Yangpu District
Railway stations in China opened in 2010
Line 10, Shanghai Metro
Railway stations in China at university and college campuses